A bucket brigade or bucket-brigade device (BBD) is a discrete-time analogue delay line, developed in 1969 by F. Sangster and K. Teer of the Philips Research Labs in the Netherlands. It consists of a series of capacitance sections C0 to Cn. The stored analogue signal is moved along the line of capacitors, one step at each clock cycle. The name comes from analogy with the term bucket brigade, used for a line of people passing buckets of water.

In most signal processing applications, bucket brigades have been replaced by devices that use digital signal processing, manipulating samples in digital form.  Bucket brigades still see use in specialty applications, such as guitar effects.

A well-known integrated circuit device around 1976, the Reticon SAD-1024 implemented two 512-stage analog delay lines in a 16-pin DIP.  It allowed clock frequencies ranging from 1.5 kHz to more than 1.5 MHz.  The SAD-512 was a single delay line version.  The Philips Semiconductors TDA1022 similarly offered a 512-stage delay line but with a clock rate range of 5–500 kHz.  Other common BBD chips include the Panasonic MN3005, MN3007, MN3204 and MN3205, with the primary differences being the available delay time.  An example of an effects unit utilizing Panasonic BBDs is the Yamaha E1010.

In 2009, the guitar effects pedal manufacturer Visual Sound recommissioned production of the Panasonic-designed MN3102 and MN3207 BBD chip that it offers for sale.

Despite being analog in their representation of individual signal voltage samples, these devices are discrete in the time domain and thus are limited by the Nyquist–Shannon sampling theorem; both the input and output signals are generally low-pass filtered. The input must be low-pass filtered to avoid aliasing effects, while the output is low-pass filtered for reconstruction. (A low-pass is used as an approximation to the Whittaker–Shannon interpolation formula.)

The concept of the bucket-brigade device led to the charge-coupled device (CCD) developed by Bell Labs for use in digital cameras. The idea of using capacitors to retain a voltage state has older origins and separately led to Dynamic random-Access memory where the charges are not propagated, but refreshed, in place.

See also 
 Switched capacitor

References 

 Theuwissen, A. (1995). Solid-State Imaging with Charge-Coupled Devices.

Analog circuits